The Mozhi is a popular romanization scheme for Malayalam script. It is primarily used for Input Method Editors for Malayalam and loosely based on ITrans scheme for Devanagari.

Inventory 
This system does not need the use of diacritics; instead, uses letter case distinction to indicate difference in vowel lengths and different groups of consonants. However, Mozhi has additional mappings to allow input using only the lowercase letters.

Features 
Since Mozhi is targeted for input, it has features tuned for that:

 Multiple Latin letters or sequences for one Malayalam character. Example: both 'za' and 'Sa' maps to 'ശ'.
 Archaic or scholarly characters are defined as refinement on contemporary characters. Example: '1#' generates native digit '൧', with '#' being the 'archaic character' operator to suffix.
 Ability to escape the Malayalam input by prefixing with '\'.

References

External links
 Girgit Online Indic to Malayalam and vice versa Transliteration of Webpages বংলা (Bengali), हिन्दी (Devanagari), ಕನ್ನಡ (Kannada), മലയാളം (Malayalam), ଓଡ଼ିଆ (Oriya), ਗੁਰਮੁਖੀ (Punjabi), தமிழ் (Tamil), తెలుగు (Telugu), ગુજરાતી (Gujarati), English.

Tamil language
Malayalam language
Transliteration